On June 7, 2017, Gisela Boniel, the then-Mayor of Bien Unido, Bohol was killed by her husband, former Bohol Provincial Board Member Niño Rey Boniel.  As of July 2022, her body remains missing.

Background

Victim and suspect

Gisela Zambrano Bendong was born on May 21, 1977 in Iligan City, Philippines to a family of pilots. Ever since she was young, she had a dream of becoming a pilot. During her early years as a pilot, she had faced discrimination from fellow male pilots due to her gender as a woman. She was the first ever female commercial pilot of Philippines AirAsia.

Niño Rey Feniza Boniel was born on December 19, 1979 in Bien Unido, Bohol to former Bien Unido mayor Cosme Boniel and Marina Feniza-Boniel, a businesswoman. In 2007, at the age of 29, he was elected mayor in Bien Unido and was the second youngest executive. Niño Rey Boniel established a dive camp to attract tourists who wanted to experience the Bien Unido Double Barrier Reef. After finding out that there were illegal fishers in the municipality, he established the underwater grotto near the coral reef in the Double Barrier Reef, consisting of the 14-foot tall statues of the Virgin Mary and Santo Niño de Cebú.

Niño met Gisela at a conference after she arrived in Tagbilaran and traveled to Bien Unido. In 2012, they married in civil rites after Gisela found out that she was two months pregnant. In July of that same year, Gisela gave birth to their first child, a son.

In 2016, after his 3rd term as a mayor of Bien Unido, Bohol ended, Gisela ran for mayor. On May 9, 2016, she was elected mayor of Bien Unido. Gisela was attacked by her husband's political opponents and implicated in controversies involving her husband.

Financial problems allegedly affected their marriage after Gisela bought a watch worth P2.5 million, which is said to have angered Niño.

Death of Gisela
On June 6, 2017, Mayor Boniel and her best friend, Angela Celeste Gamalinda-Leyson, and Angela's 17-year-old son Pete were persuaded by Wilson Hoylar, her admin staff, and her executive secretary Brian Sayson to stay overnight at a resort in Bien Unido. They said the Mayor needed to sign some important documents which were not part of her itinerary. Angela was urged not to and reminded her of her 7:00 PM appointment in Cebu. Her plan was to comply with signing the required documents for her to file the annulment case, and at the same time to resign from her post as the Mayor of Bien Unido, Bohol.

On June 7, 2017, at around 2:00AM, 6 to 8 men entered their room. The men duct taped Angela around her face and she was tasered on the lower portion of her ears. Angela overheard the Mayor talking to her husband, recognized by his nickname "In-In". She pleaded for him to spare her best friend and told him that Angela's son was in the other room while a gun was pointed to her forehead. Angela then passed out, not knowing that the Mayor was already taken out from the room. A few hours later two men woke Angela and asked her to stand up as she and her 17 year old son were taken to Tubigon, and were forced to board a high-speed craft from Tubigon to Cebu. Mayor Gisela was listed by the men in the boat manifesto, to make it appear that the mayor also boarded the fast craft to Cebu.

Meanwhile, Mayor Gisela's body was wrapped with a blanket and brought to a pump boat. At around 4:00 AM, Niño allegedly shot her, they put a fishnet around her body, tied a rock weighing 30 kilos to it and threw her body into the sea somewhere between the Olango Island Group and Bohol.

During the interrogation, Niño Rey said it was his cousin, Riolito "Etad" Boniel who shot his wife, but Riolito and driver Randel Lupas alleged that it was Niño who shot her.

Retrieval of Boniel's body
Search and retrieval operations started on June 9. Divers scoured the waters near Caubian island at  but they couldn't find Gisela's body. The deadline was intended to be 15 days. After days of searching, the retrieval operation ended but Gisela's family appealed to the authorities that they could resume. On July 15, 2017, the search and retrieval operation ended permanently as they could not find Gisela's body.

On July 1, 2017, A woman's body was found in the waters of Tabuelan and was brought to Escalante, Negros Occidental. There was speculation that this could be Gisela's body. The body was later ruled out to be that of Boniel and was identified as the body of a 64 year old woman who is a resident from Calatrava, Negros Occidental.

Memorial
Although Gisela's body was not found, her family held a memorial service on the sea on July 1, 2017 in Caubian Island. In November 2017, they had an All Souls Day on the sea.

Trial
Niño Rey pleaded not guilty for kidnapping, serious illegal detention and physical injuries. On January 11, 2018, Niño was brought to Cebu jail. Due to his poor health condition, he was treated in Cebu Provincial Detention and Rehabilitation Center.

On March 22, 2018, Justice Secretary Vitaliano Aguirre II reversed the  order, but on March 28, after facing backlash, Aguirre revived the  order.

On May 28, Niño Rey's pre-trial for kidnapping and serious illegal detention was reset to September 5.

On June 14, 2018, Niño Rey Boniel resigned his post as Bohol Board Member, and his trial was set for September 7. On September 7, Niño Rey did not attend his trial due to his health concerns. The Bendong family, through their lawyer Amando Virgil Ligutan, released a statement alleging that Niño Rey's reason to be intentionally absent was because of his unpreparedness to attend the hearing.

On September 12, 2019, two murder suspects involved in the crime are arrested after they were found hiding in Lapu-Lapu City.

On February 8, 2022, Boniel pleaded guilty to homicide after admitting into killing Gisela and was sentenced to 8–14 years in prison. He is currently facing separate cases of serious illegal detention and kidnapping.

In popular culture
The case was featured on GMA Network's investigative docudrama program Imbestigador in an episode entitled "Mayora". Gisela Boniel was portrayed by Rhian Ramos, while her best friend Angela Leyson portrayed by Coleen Perez, and Niño Rey Boniel portrayed by Geoff Eigenmann

References

2017 deaths
2017 murders in the Philippines
Filipino murder victims
Assassinated Filipino people
Assassinated Filipino politicians
Assassinated mayors
People from Iligan
Violence against women in the Philippines